Cheating Cheaters is a 1934 American comedy film directed by Richard Thorpe, written by James Mulhauser, Allen Rivkin and Gladys Buchanan Unger and starring Fay Wray and Cesar Romero, with a supporting cast featuring Minna Gombell, Henry Armetta, Francis L. Sullivan and Hugh O'Connell. The picture was released on November 5, 1934, by Universal Pictures.

Plot
The Palmers, a gang of thieves posing as a wealthy family, move next door to the Lazarres with plans of robbing them.  The Palmers don't realize is that the Lazarres are also a gang of criminals planning to rob their new wealthy neighbors, the Palmers.

Cast 
Fay Wray as Nan Brockton
Cesar Romero as Tom Palmer
Minna Gombell as Nell Brockton
Henry Armetta as Prof. Tony Verdi
Francis L. Sullivan as Dr. George Brockton
Hugh O'Connell as Steve Wilson
Wallis Clark as Mr. Palmer
Ann Shoemaker as Mrs. Grace Palmer
John T. Murray as Ira Lazarie
George Barraud as Phil
Morgan Wallace as Holmes
Harold Huber as Edgar 'Legs' Finelli

References

External links 
 

1934 films
1930s English-language films
American comedy films
1934 comedy films
Universal Pictures films
Films directed by Richard Thorpe
American black-and-white films
Films scored by Edward Ward (composer)
1930s American films